Mike's Place is an Israeli chain of bars, with three bars around the country.

History
In 1992 Michael Vigodda, a photojournalist, opened Mike's Place in downtown Jerusalem. Vigodda named the bar after another bar called "Mike's Place" located at the Carleton University Student's Center in Ottawa, Ontario, Canada. This was, in turn, named after former Canadian Prime Minister and statesman Lester B. "Mike" Pearson, who won the 1957 Nobel Peace Prize for his role in defusing the Suez Crisis.

In 1995, Assaf Ganzman, an Israeli blues musician and vocalist for a band called SOBO, became an owner of the bar after Vigodda returned to Canada.

Locations

Mike's Place bars

In 1999, the bar moved to Jerusalem's Russian Compound and in 2005 to Jaffa Road. In 2001, a second branch was opened in Tel Aviv, next to the American Embassy on the Tel Aviv beachfront. The Jerusalem branch closed on January 4, 2009, when the 19th-century building in which it was housed was demolished.
In October 2010, Mike's Place re-opened in Jerusalem at a new location also on Jaffa Road. The Jerusalem branch, the first Mike's Place franchise, is owned and operated by Jerusalem architect Reuben Beiser.

As of 2020, there are 3 branches of Mike's Place: 
 Tel Aviv, promenade 
 Jerusalem
 Eilat

Kashrut
The Jerusalem location is kosher. The other locations are in primarily secular areas of Israel where Jews do not typically keep the laws of Shabbat. Therefore, if the locations were to be kosher they must close on Friday nights, a very popular night for bars in secular areas.

Suicide bombing

On April 30, 2003, a Palestinian suicide bombing perpetrated by British Muslims killed three civilians and wounded 50 others in Tel Aviv.

See also

 Culture of Israel
 Israeli cuisine
 Economy of Israel
 List of restaurants in Israel

References

Israeli companies established in 1992
Restaurant chains in Israel
Restaurants established in 1992